Lycoperdon radicatum is a species of puffball mushroom in the family Agaricaceae. It was described in 1848 by French botanists Michel Charles Durieu de Maisonneuve and Camille Montagne. It is nonpoisonous.

References

External links

Fungi described in 1848
Fungi of Europe
radicatum
Taxa named by Camille Montagne